Imara Jones is the creator of TransLash Media, a cross-platform journalism, personal storytelling and narrative project. She was also the host of The Last Sip, a weekly, half-hour news show which targeted Millennials of color, especially women and the LGBTQ community. She is transgender.

In 2019 she chaired the first-ever United Nations High Level Meeting on Gender Diversity with over 600 participants.

Jones’ work as a host, on-air news analyst, and writer focuses on social justice and equity issues. She has been featured in a number of news outlets such as The Guardian, The Nation, MSNBC, CNBC, NPR, Mic, The Grio,  ColorLines and the In The Thick podcast. She was also interviewed for the New York City Trans Oral History Project in collaboration with the New York Public Library.

Jones has held economic policy posts in the Clinton White House and communications positions at Viacom, where she led the award-winning Know HIV-AIDS campaign. She holds degrees from the London School of Economics and Columbia. Jones is currently a Soros Equality Fellow and on the board of the Anti Violence Project  and the New Pride Agenda.

Education and early life

Jones holds an undergraduate degree in political science from Columbia University, and a master's degree in economics from the London School of Economics.   Prior to her career in journalism, Jones worked on international trade policy at the Clinton White House, and as an executive at Viacom.

Awards and titles

Jones has won Emmy and Peabody awards for her work. She was named a 2018 Champion of Pride by The Advocate magazine.

References

External links

African-American activists
African-American women journalists
African-American journalists
LGBT African Americans
Living people
People from Atlanta
Transgender women
Transgender rights activists
American LGBT journalists
Peabody Award winners
Columbia College (New York) alumni
Alumni of the London School of Economics
Year of birth missing (living people)
21st-century American women
21st-century African-American women